This list of Army Burn Hall College alumni includes students who studied at any of ABHC’s campuses in Abbottabad, Pakistan. This article summarizes some of the more notable ABHC alumni, or Hallians - as they are called - with some indication of the reasons they are notable in the world. The Burn Hall Alumni Association is the official and formal community of Hallians which has numerous national and international chapters.

Members of this list must either have an existing Wikipedia article or be referenced with reliable sources that mention the school.

Alumni
 Professor Dr Akbar S. Ahmed (born 1943), Cambridge University, CSP, author, producer of the film Jinnah; studied (1954–1959) 
 Lt Gen (R) Ali Kuli Khan Khattak, Pakistan Army
 Professor Hassan Abbas, scholar and writer, studied 1981-83 Hassan Abbas (legal scholar)
 Ex Chairman Senate, Acting President Wasim Sajjad
 Admiral (r) Noman Bashir, former Pakistan Navy officer 
 Salman Bashir, former Foreign Secretary of Pakistan 
 Maj Gen (r) Mahmud Ali Durrani (1947–1959), ex-Ambassador to the US; former National Security Advisor to PPP/Zardari Govt
 Lt Gen Farrakh Khan (1957), former Chief of General Staff, former DG Pakistan Rangers
 Lt Gen (r) Munir Hafiez, former Pakistan Army general and ex-Chairman NAB
 The Nawab of Junagarh (circa 1960s), present Nawab Sahib Muhammad Jahangir Khanji 
 Iftikhar Ahmed 'Ifti', Pakistani cricket commentator (1959)
 Prof Daud Kamal, Pakistani poet and scholar
 Prof Omar Tarin (Omer Salim Khan, SC 1983) Pakistani poet and scholar
 Prof Dr Ajmal Khan, Vice-Chancellor of the Islamia College University, Peshawar
 Maj Gen Hassan Azhar Hayat Khan, formerly represented Pakistan Army on special mission to China; later commanded Pakistan Army forces in North Waziristan (FSc 83)
 Nawab Muhammad Saeed Khan, last Nawab of Amb 
 Nawabzada Salahuddin Saeed Khan ex-MNA and Chief of Tanoli tribe
 Chaudhary Nisar Ali Khan (1968 Senior Cambridge), Member of National Assembly, political party PML-N; present leader of the opposition, since 2008
 Gohar Ayub Khan, politician, son of late Gen Muhammad Ayub Khan
 , the hero and victim of Christchurch mosque shootings
 Wing Commander Mervyn Middlecoat, airforce ace pilot and 1971 War hero
 Lt Gen (r) Tariq Khan, former Pakistan Army general (SC 1973)
 Haissam Hussain, director of the film Bin Roye (2015) and the TV series Durr-e-Shehwar (2012–2012), Aik Nayee Cinderella (2012–2013), Bin Roye (2016–2017).
 Dr Tariq Rahman, linguist, scholar and author, Emeritus Professor at Quaid-i-Azam University, Islamabad, Pakistan
 Miangul Asfandyar Amir Zeb, politician, former education Minister NWFP
 Omar Ayub Khan, MNA and Pakistani minister
 Raja Muhammad Asad Khan, ex-MNA from district Jhelum, Punjab (2002-2012)
 Yousuf Ayub Khan, ex-MPA and ex-provincial minister in NWFP/KPK 
 Akbar Ayub Khan, MP from Haripur district, NWFP/KPK (2016)
 Muhammad Azam Khan, Former Principal Secretary to PM Khan.

See also 
Alumnus
List of Pakistanis

References

Lists of Pakistani people by school affiliation